Anish Khem (born  27 August 1993) is a Fijian footballer who plays as a midfielder for Suva F.C. He represented Fiji in the football competition at the 2016 Summer Olympics.

Club career
Khem was born in Labasa, Fiji. He left Rewa F.C. for Suva F.C. in January 2022.

International career
Khem made his debut for the Fiji national team on 26 June 2016 in a friendly game against Malaysia. In this game, which ended in a 1–1 draw. He played the first 45 minutes before being replaced by Kolinio Sivoki.

Personal life
His brother, Ashnil Raju, is also a footballer.

References

External links

Living people
1994 births
Fijian people of Indian descent
Fijian footballers
Association football midfielders
Fiji international footballers
Olympic footballers of Fiji
Footballers at the 2016 Summer Olympics
Nadi F.C. players
Rewa F.C. players
Suva F.C. players